Xyloplax janetae is a Xyloplax of the family Xyloplacidae. It lives on the surface of wood sunken to abyssal depths.

Morphology
It has adambulacral spines which are spines that project radially from the margin of the animal, of distinct morphology. On its dorsal (abactinal surface) it has many projecting abactinal spines whose morphology is distinct from the adambulacral spines.

Habitat and behaviour
Xyloplax janetae is a bathyal abyssal species, meaning it is found in the deepest part of the open ocean. It has only been found clinging to sunken wood.

Feeding
Xyloplax janetae is found clinging to sunken wood, where it feeds on the bacteria which decay the wood.

References

External links

Peripodida
Animals described in 2006